Ladouceur is a surname that may refer to:

Ben Ladouceur (born 1987), Canadian writer
Bob Ladouceur (born 1954), American football coach
Dan Ladouceur (born 1973), former lacrosse player
Fernand Ladouceur (1925–1999), Progressive Conservative party member of the Canadian House of Commons
Jacques LaDouceur (born 1959), retired Haitian-American soccer forward
L. P. Ladouceur (born 1981), Canadian-born American football player
Randy Ladouceur (born 1960), current assistant coach of the Montreal Canadiens

See also
R. v. Ladouceur, 1 S.C.R. 1257 is a leading decision of the Supreme Court of Canada on the constitutionality of random police traffic checks